Anikay Air Company was a charter airline based in Bishkek in Kyrgyzstan. The airline president, Alfiya Galiaskarova, planned to establish Anikay Air as a major operator from Kyrgyzstan to CIS and the Middle East.

The airline was on the list of air carriers banned in the European Union.

Fleet 
The Anikay Air fleet included the following aircraft (at March 2008):

1 Boeing 737-200

External links
Anikay Air Fleet

References

Defunct airlines of Kyrgyzstan
Airlines established in 2003
Airlines disestablished in 2007